WUVF-LD (channel 2) is a low-power television station licensed to Naples, Florida, United States, serving Southwest Florida as an affiliate of Univision and UniMás. Locally owned by Sun Broadcasting, it is sister to two other Naples-licensed stations: CW affiliate WXCW (channel 46) and low-power WANA-LD (channel 16). Fort Myers Broadcasting Company, which owns Fort Myers-licensed CBS affiliate WINK-TV (channel 11), operates WUVF, WXCW and WANA under a shared services agreement (SSA). The stations share studios on Palm Beach Boulevard (SR 80) in northeast Fort Myers, while WUVF-LD's transmitter is located on Channel 30 Drive (on a tower shared with several radio stations).

WLZE-LD (channel 51) in Fort Myers operates as a translator of WUVF-LD; this station's transmitter is located north of Fort Myers Shores near the Charlotte–Lee county line.

History

On April 4, 2008, Equity Media Holdings announced the sale of all five of its Southwest Florida stations (including WUVF and WLZE) to Luken Communications for $8 million. Equity has cited corporate financial losses as a reason for the sale. Equity Media Holdings filed for Chapter 11 bankruptcy in December 2008; offers by Luken Communications to acquire Equity-owned stations in six markets were later withdrawn.

WUVF and WLZE were sold at auction to private equity firm Silver Point Capital on April 16, 2009. The sale was finalized on August 17, 2009. Following the purchase, WUVF surrendered its class A classification.

WLZE began to be carried on Dish Network on October 7, 2009; the satellite provider had earlier obtained WUVF's programming via sister station WEVU-CA (channel 4), which had served as a WUVF satellite since 2006 (and simulcast the 6 p.m. newscast for some time before adding the remainder of WUVF's schedule), that station was taken silent on August 14, 2009—three days before the completion of the sale to Silver Point. SP Television reached a deal to sell WUVF and WLZE to Media Vista Group on December 21, 2012.

On April 1, 2019, Media Vista Group announced that it was selling its stations, including WUVF-LD, to Sun Broadcasting, Inc. for $9.75 million. The sale was completed on July 1.

Digital channels
The station's digital signal is multiplexed:

Newscasts
During the mid-2000s after joining Univision, WUVF began airing half-hour Spanish-language local newscasts at 6 and 11 p.m. The broadcasts were produced out Equity Media's headquarters in Little Rock, Arkansas, with news reports filed by reporters based in Southwest Florida. The newscasts were canceled in June 2008, after Equity instituted a companywide suspension of news programs as a cost-cutting measure.  Local news returned to the station in 2013 as part of the D'Latinos program, produced and aired locally by Media Vista.

References

External links 
 
Facebook—Univisión SW Florida

Univision network affiliates
Low-power television stations in the United States
Equity Media Holdings
UVF-LD
Television channels and stations established in 1996
UVF-LD
1996 establishments in Florida